Kim Seok (born 9 September 1991) is a South Korean football player who plays as a forward.

Career
He dropped out of school and moved to France in 2001. He joined the FC Metz's youth academy at the age of ten and played until 2005 summer. From 2007 to 2008 season, he has played Stade de Reims youth academy until 2009–10 season. In June 2010, he came back to South Korea and contracted with Challengers League, at that time called K3 League, side Cheonan FC. In Cheonan he played 8 games and 3 goals, including 2 games and 1 goals at inter league. From 2011, he contracted with Gangwon FC and played in reserve league mainly.

References

External links

1991 births
Living people
Association football forwards
South Korean footballers
Gangwon FC players
K League 1 players